František Čermák and Leoš Friedl were the defending champions, but Čermák chose not to participate, and only Friedl competed that year.
Friedl partnered with Michael Kohlmann, but lost in the quarterfinals to Jordan Kerr and David Škoch.

Potito Starace and Martín Vassallo Argüello won in the final 6–0, 6–2, against Lukáš Dlouhý and Pavel Vízner.

Seeds

Draw

Draw

External links
Draw

2007 Abierto Mexicano Telcel
Abierto Mexicano Telcel